O surdato 'nnammurato (in English: "The Soldier in Love") is a famous song written in the Neapolitan language. The song is used as the anthem of S.S.C. Napoli.

The words were written by Aniello Califano and the music composed by Enrico Cannio in 1915. The song describes the sadness of a soldier who is fighting at the front during World War I, and who pines for his beloved. Originally Cannio's sheet music was published with piano accompaniment, but in recordings, on 78rpm, then LP, Neapolitan standards such as O surdato have usually been orchestrated to suit each tenor.

Lyrics 

 Original lyrics 
 Staje luntana da stu core
 e a te volo cu 'o penziero:
 niente voglio e niente spero
 ca tenerte sempe a ffianco a me!
 Si' sicura 'e chist'ammore
 comm'i' so' sicuro 'e te...

 Oje vita, oje vita mia...
 oje core 'e chistu core...
 si' stata 'o primmo ammore...
 e 'o primmo e ll'ùrdemo sarraje pe' me!

 Quanta notte nun te veco,
 nun te sento 'int'a sti bbracce,
 nun te vaso chesta faccia,
 nun t'astregno forte 'mbraccio a me?
 Ma, scetánnome 'a sti suonne,
 mme faje chiagnere pe' te...

 Oje vita, oje vita mia [...]

 Scrive sempe e sta' cuntenta:
 io nun penzo che a te sola...
 Nu penziero mme cunzola,
 ca tu pienze sulamente a me...
 'A cchiù bella 'e tutt'e bbelle,
 nun è maje cchiù bella 'e te!

 Oje vita, oje vita mia [...]

English translation:
 You are far away from this heart,
 I fly to you in thought:
 I hope and want nothing more
 than always keeping you by my side!
 Be sure about this love
 As I am sure of you...

 Oh life, oh my life...
 Oh heart of this heart...
 You were the first love...
 and the first and last you will be for me!

 How many nights have I not seen you,
 not felt you in my arms,
 not kissed your face,
 not held you tight in my arms?!
 But, waking from these dreams,
 you make me cry for you...

 Oh life, oh my life [...]

 Always write and be happy:
 I can only think of you...
 One thought comforts me,
 that you only think of me...
 The most beautiful woman of all,
 is never more beautiful than you!

 Oh life, oh my life [...]

The Corrs when performing with Luciano Pavarotti used the following English lyrics for the second verse:

 So many nights without you
 without you in my arms
 I can kiss you, I can draw you close to me
 but wake up from your slumber
 you make me cry for you!

Notable performances and recordings
 Mario Lanza Mario! 1958 
 Sergio Franchi on Romantic Italian Songs. 1962 RCA Victor Red Seal album. Billboard Top 200 (number seventeen)
 Franco Corelli on Passione. 1963 
 Giuseppe di Stefano on Neapolitan Songs III 1965
 Anna Magnani's performance of the song, in the film La sciantosa (1971), is well known, as is the version of Massimo Ranieri.  
 Luciano Pavarotti on Favourite Neapolitan songs 1981
 Luciano Pavarotti duet with the Corrs. The middle verse is sung in English 
 Andrea Bocelli on "Incanto" (2008)
 Vittorio Grigolo on "Arrivederci" (2011)

See also
 Nini Grassia directed a film which took its name from the song in 1983.

References

External links 
 , 1983
 E-chords
 Italian translation

1915 songs
Neapolitan songs
Songs about soldiers
Songs about the military
Songs of World War I